Schizothorax beipanensis is a species of ray-finned fish in the genus Schizothorax which is found in the upper tributaries of the Beipan River in China.

References 

Schizothorax
Fish described in 2009